The boys' medley relay competition at the 2010 Youth Olympic Games was held on 23 August 2010 in Bishan Stadium. The competitors were divided in 5 teams, each representing a different continent.

Schedule

Results

Final

External links
 iaaf.org - Men's medley relay
 

Athletics at the 2010 Summer Youth Olympics